Rick Leach and Brian MacPhie were the defending champions, but lost in the first round this year.

Bob Bryan and Mike Bryan won the title, defeating Wayne Arthurs and Paul Hanley 7–5, 6–4 in the final.

Seeds

Draw

Draw

External links
Draw

Tennis Channel Open
2005 ATP Tour
2005 Tennis Channel Open